The Moschettieri del Duce ("Musketeers of the Duce") were an elite unit of the Volunteer Militia for National Security, who served as Benito Mussolini's honor guard at Palazzo Venezia and during military parades and Fascist ceremonies, similar to what the Corazzieri were to the King. They also provided internal security during the meetings of the Grand Council of Fascism.

The corps was established on 11 February 1923; its members were chosen among the most loyal members of the MVSN and numbered 180, organized into squads of five men. Stationed in Rome, the unit was directly subordinated to the command-in-chief of the MVSN. A basic requirement to enlist in the Moschettieri was to have completed the compulsory military service as Army officers; service was voluntary and its members did not receive any pay.

The Moschettieri del Duce were formally dissolved in 1940, when many of its members departed for the front after Italy's entry into World War II, but de facto continued to exist until the fall of the Fascist regime on 25 July 1943. Its last commander, from September 1936 to July 1943, was centurione (Captain), later seniore (Major), Mario D'Havet.

References

Blackshirts